Nelson Balang Rining is a Malaysian politician from PDP. He was the Member of Sarawak State Legislative Assembly for Ba'kelalan from 2004 to 2011 and is currently the Deputy President of PDP. He is one of the member of the Board of Directors of LAKU Management Sdn Bhd, a Sarawak government owned company, after being appointed on 7 July 2020.

Election results

Awards and recognitions 
  :
  Companion of the Order of the Defender of the Realm (JMN) (2010) 
  Commander of the Order of Meritorious Service (PJN) - Datuk (2012)

References 

Progressive Democratic Party (Malaysia) politicians
Commanders of the Order of Meritorious Service
Companions of the Order of the Defender of the Realm
Living people
Year of birth missing (living people)
Members of the Sarawak State Legislative Assembly